Patrick Sylvestre (born 1 September 1968, in Bure, Switzerland) is a retired Swiss football midfielder.

He made his debut for the Swiss national team in 1989 against Spain, and was capped 11 times. He was in the Swiss squad at the 1994 FIFA World Cup, but only played 7 minutes during the game against Romania. This was his last international match. He was also in the roster for Euro 1996, but never played a game.

Honours
 Swiss league champion 1997 with FC Sion
 Swiss Cup champion 1993 with FC Lugano 
 Swiss Cup champion 1996 with FC Sion 
 Swiss Cup champion 1997 with FC Sion

References

1968 births
Living people
People from Porrentruy District
Swiss men's footballers
Switzerland international footballers
Association football midfielders
FC La Chaux-de-Fonds players
FC Sion players
FC Lugano players
Swiss Super League players
1994 FIFA World Cup players
UEFA Euro 1996 players
Sportspeople from the canton of Jura